Miika Lahti (born 6 February 1987) is a Finnish professional ice hockey centre. He is currently playing for EC VSV of the Erste Bank Hockey League.

Playing career
Lahti played exclusively with JYP until the 2016–17 season, leaving to join inaugural Chinese club, Kunlun Red Star of the Kontinental Hockey League (KHL).

At the conclusion of his contract, Lahti opted to return to his original club, JYP, however sat out the following 2017–18 season, due to rehabilitating a hip injury. He returned to playing in the 2018–19 season, securing a one-year deal on May 25, 2018.

References

External links

1987 births
Living people
JYP Jyväskylä players
HC Kunlun Red Star players
Finnish ice hockey centres
Finnish expatriates in China